Michel Grandjean (12 April 1931 – 11 December 2010) was a Swiss pair skater. With his sister Silvia Grandjean, he won the 1954 European Figure Skating Championships. They placed 7th at the 1952 Winter Olympics. The also participated at various skating shows including Ice Capades and Holiday on Ice.

Results
(pairs with Silvia Grandjean)

References

External links

1931 births
2010 deaths
Swiss male pair skaters
Olympic figure skaters of Switzerland
Figure skaters at the 1952 Winter Olympics
World Figure Skating Championships medalists
European Figure Skating Championships medalists